Moskovske is a village in Pokrovsk Raion (district) in Donetsk Oblast of eastern Ukraine.

Demographics
Native language as of the Ukrainian Census of 2001:
 Ukrainian 44.21%
 Russian 55.79%

References

Villages in Pokrovsk Raion